The Fleurieu Art Prize is a non-acquisitive award, open to Australian visual artists aged 18 years and older. The Prize encompasses any two- or three-dimensional artwork submissions that follow an annual thematic concept and includes a monetary gift and significant exposure for the artists and their works. Exhibitions for the Prize are held in various South Australian locations, including McLaren Vale and Goolwa, garnering attention and merit from tourists, art appreciators, and critics alike at places such as; Stump Hill Gallery, Fleurieu Visitors Information Centre, the Fleurieu Art House and the Hardy's Tintara Sculpture Park.

Origins and History
The Fleurieu Art Prize was established in 1998, in South Australia. Named after the Fleurieu Peninsula, the first exhibitions were held in the venues surrounding this area. Across the many years of its prevalence, the Fleurieu Art Prize has undergone multiple name changes, including being alternatively referred to as the Fleurieu Biennale Art Prize. Founders of the Prize include artist David Dridan, vigneron Greg Trott, and businessman Tony Parkinson epitomising the amalgamation of cultural, artistic and economic aspects that make the Prize such a significant South Australian tradition. Upon its founding, the Prize was funded and supported by major local wineries, and it continues to be supported by these organisations and other local, South Australian businesses today.

Notably, between 1998 and 2018 the Prize has been awarded ten times, with the most recent being the first awarded to two artists; James Tylor and Laura Willis for their painting Hidden Landscapes: Kangaroo Island. These artists received a monetary prize of $25,000 (AUD) for their collaborative work, however in 2016 the Prize winner Tony Albert was awarded $65,000 (AUD) for his wall installation The Hand You're Dealt, therefore crediting the Fleurieu Art Prize to be the richest landscape prize in the world for that year. Similarly, in 2016 the Prize was awarded in conjunction with the community-run festival exhibition, the Fleurieu Food + Wine Art Prize. The FF + WAP award requirements stipulated "any paintings with a food and wine theme" were eligible for a non-acquisitive prize of $10,000 Australian dollars as well as consequent exposure during the community exhibit made in concurrence with the Fleurieu Art Prize exhibition. At the Anne & Gordon Samstag Museum of Art in Adelaide, along with the Fleurieu Art Prize winner Tony Albert, Fran Callen received the Fleurieu Food + Wine Art Prize for her painting Tabletop 1.

Significance
The Fleurieu Art Prize has grown in prestige and cultural value over the years since its founding, causing great financial value for the local McLaren Vale area, and ultimately South Australia as a whole. The Fleuireu Art Prize garners widespread attention from aspiring Australian visual artists, generating traffic towards the exhibitions and community-run festivals held in the McLaren Vale region. This popularity reaps economic and cultural benefits for both artists and the community; the artists are able to showcase their work to a large audience of their peers and a panel of critics, enabling further exposure around their artistry and helping to build a positive reputation for their careers, enabling further inflow of clients. Similarly, the winning artists are awarded non-acquisitive financial prizes, and time to exhibit their work in local galleries, which is a crucial support to new, local artists. Furthermore, the community is able to benefit economically in numerous ways, as the Prize incentivises local news and social media coverage, promoting tourism for South Australia, enabling visitors and participants to directly contribute to local businesses. Similarly, official pamphlets, brochures, flyers and newsletters associated with the Prize promote key local small and major businesses, creating more income for the local economy.

However, the Prize also merits cultural value in that the central themes imposed on the artworks invite an appreciation of Australian lifestyle, landscapes, and customs. Hence, appropriate to its growth in participation and viewership, the Prize has become an inextricable thread in the fabric of the South Australian community, with business owners and artists alike relying on the award for their incomes, their careers, and to be reminded of their Australian patriotism.

Previous Winners

List of winners
Winners for the Fleurieu Art Prize include:
 1998 - Robert Hannaford
 2000 - Elisabeth Cummings
 2002 - Joe Furlonger
 2004 - Ian Grant
 2006 - Ken Whisson
 2008 - Tim Burns
 2011 - Julie Harris
 2013 - Fiona Lowry
 2016 - Tony Albert
 2018 - James Tylor and Laura Wills

Tony Albert - The Hand You're Dealt

Tony Albert, a Queensland originating but Sydney located artist, won the 2016 Fleurieu Art Prize for his wall installation The Hand You're Dealt. His installation marks the first to receive the award after the Prize organisers decidedly extended restrictions on art forms from paintings to other mediums. Albert's piece consists of hundreds of small sculptures made from playing cards and "kitsch souvenirs" embellished with deliberate images and symbols of Aboriginal culture. Tony Albert won a $65, 0000 prize for his work, making him the winner of the richest landscape prize in the world in 2016.

James Tylor and Laura Wills - Hidden Landscapes: Kangaroo Island
Celebrating the 20th Anniversary of the Fleurieu Biennale Art Prize, James Tylor and Laura Willis won a $25, 000 (AUD) award for their collaborative work Hidden Landscapes: Kangaroo Island. The piece is a hyper-realistic drawing on photographic paper and is notably, the only artwork where the creative responsibility was shared between two artists, and won. The work was showcased at Stump Hill Gallery and would also feature at the Fleurieu Arthouse in McLaren Vale and Signal Point Gallery in Goolwa until Tylor brought the work to GAGprojects in Kent Town for the 2018 SALA Festival.

2020 Cancellation
In 2020 the Fleurieu Art Prize made plans to return to McLaren Vale for its 21st Anniversary with the theme 'Of the Earth' and two non-acquisitive prizes of $20,000.   However, due to COVID-19 complications regarding restrictions on the number of people able to enter the gallery at a time, the significant financial strain on artists, and local, supporting businesses the Fleurieu Biennale organisation decided to cancel the 2020 Prize and intend to make a decision about its possible 2022 return by the end of June 2021.

References

External links
 Official site

Awards established in 1998
Australian art awards
Fleurieu Peninsula
1998 establishments in Australia